The coccygeal plexus is a nerve plexus near the coccyx bone.

Structure
This plexus is formed by the ventral rami of the fourth and fifth sacral nerves, S4 & S5, and the ventral ramus of the coccygeal nerve, Co. The relative contributions of S4 and S5 are minor and major, respectively. It gives rise to the anococcygeal nerve.

See also
  Coccydynia (coccyx pain, tailbone pain)
 Ganglion impar
 Sacral plexus

References

External links
Description at uams.edu
Coccyx pain (tailbone pain, coccydynia) (Peer-reviewed medical chapter, available free online at eMedicine)

Nerve plexus
Spinal nerves
Nerves of the lower limb and lower torso